Constance Elizabeth Swaniker (born 1973) is a Ghanaian sculptor and entrepreneur. She is the founder and CEO of Accent & Arts, and also the founder of Design and Technical Institute (DTI) in Accra.

Early life and education 
Swaniker was born on 30 August 1973 in Accra, Ghana. She had parts of her early education in Botswana, Zimbabwe, and Gambia. She later entered the Accra Academy for secondary education, where she obtained her A-Level certificate in 1993. Following her secondary education, she enrolled at the Kwame Nkrumah University of Science and Technology to pursue a bachelor of Arts degree in Sculpture, after which she graduated in 1999.

Career 
While at the university, Swaniker worked as an apprentice specialising in carpentry at Art Deco Ltd. Six months after her graduation from Kwame Nkrumah University of Science and Technology, she founded Accents & Art Ltd a Ghanaian company that produces artistic products with wrought iron, cane and glass, and also incorporates the Design and Technology Institute (DTI).

Through partnerships with universities such the Kwame Nkrumah University of Science and Technology, Ashesi University, Takoradi Technical University, and Ho Technical University, Accent & Arts has been able to provide internships and contractual apprenticeships to over 600 youths since 2009.

In March 2016, Swaniker founded and chief executive officer the Design and Technical Institute (DTI), an academic institute which is intended to bridge the gap between academia and industry.

Works
Swaniker's works have been showcased in many exhibitions in Ghana and outside Ghana. They include her first exhibition; Passage of Discovery, which was held at the Alliance of Artists Gallery. The event run from 22 June to 6 July 2011. Her works were also showcased in the Juxtaposed, Light & Darkness exhibition which was held in Nike Arts and Cultural Centre buildings in Nigeria from 5 November to 14 November 2011. In March 2015, her works were showcased at the UNESCO head office in Paris.

Honours
Swaniker's works have been recognised locally and internationally. In 2010, she was a recipient of The Network Journal Africa 40 under 40 Achievement award. That same year, she was recognised as the best entrepreneur by the SME Innovation Award scheme. In 2013 she was awarded the LISCO Be Your Dream Award, and Metal Product of the Year Award. That same year she was the Regional Country Winner of the Africa's Most Influential Women in Leadership and Governance Award. In 2014, her firm, Accent and Arts was the Country and Regional Winner of Metal fabrication company of the year award. In 2017 she was the recipient of Africa's Most Influential Women in Business and Government, and Woman of Excellence Awards during the Ghana manufacturing awards. She received another Ghana Manufacturing award in 2018.

References 

Ghanaian artists
Ghanaian sculptors
Alumni of the Accra Academy
Kwame Nkrumah University of Science and Technology alumni
Ghanaian chief executives
Ghanaian educators
1973 births
Living people